Farmleigh is the official Irish state guest house. It was formerly one of the Dublin residences of the Guinness family. It is situated on an elevated position above the River Liffey to the north-west of the Phoenix Park, in Castleknock. The estate of  consists of extensive private gardens with stands of mature cypress, pine and oak trees, a boating pond, walled garden, sunken garden, out offices and a herd of rare native Kerry cattle. It was purchased by the Government of Ireland from the 4th Earl of Iveagh in 1999 for €29.2 million. A state body—the Office of Public Works (OPW)—spent in the region of €23 million restoring the house, gardens and curvilinear glasshouses, bringing the total cost to the state to €52.2 million. Farmleigh was opened to the public in July 2001.

History

Farmleigh was once a small (two-storey) Georgian house built in the mid-18th century. It originally belonged to the Coote and then Trench families. Farmleigh Bridge was added to the estate in the 1870s to carry electricity lines from the mill race turbine on the Strawberry Beds to the house.

In 1873, the house and estate were purchased by the then Edward Guinness (1847–1927) when he married his cousin Adelaide Guinness. He was a great-grandson of Arthur Guinness and was created Baron Iveagh in 1891 and Earl of Iveagh in 1919.

Edward Guinness commissioned a major renovation and extension programme to extend the house to the west and add a third floor. These works took place between 1881 and 1884 and were completed to designs by Irish architect James Franklin Fuller. A ballroom was added in 1896, designed by the Scottish architect William Young. The conservatory was added in 1901.

As many of the house's features were commissioned by The 1st Earl of Iveagh, visitors gain some insight into his character from the landscaped gardens, classical architecture, and sober symmetrical layout. There are also tapestries on display, which the 1st Earl collected while travelling through Europe as a young man. The Earl's library, on loan to the state, contains some of the earliest books printed in Ireland. Farmleigh eventually passed to Rupert, 2nd Earl of Iveagh, and remained in the ownership of the Guinness family throughout the rest of the 20th century.

Current use

The estate was purchased from The 4th Earl of Iveagh by the State in 1999. The official purpose for the €29.2 million purchase, and subsequent expenditure of €23 million in refurbishment, was that it would be used for state purposes. Specifically, it is designated as "an official State guest house for visiting heads of State and dignitaries. Some notable visitors have been hosted at Farmleigh including the Chinese Prime Minister, the Prime Minister of Ethiopia, the King of Malaysia, British Prime Minister Tony Blair, the Governor-General of New Zealand, and Queen Elizabeth II of the United Kingdom. However, the estate only hosted seven visiting dignitaries in 2006 (the most in one year), six in 2008, and only two the following year. Also in 2009, 246,000 members of the public visited the estate.

In 2006 it was announced by the Office of Public Works (OPW) that the Steward's Lodge which is located in the grounds of Farmleigh had been renovated. It was speculated at the time that the lodge was to become an official residence of the Taoiseach. Former Taoiseach Brian Cowen used the lodge for this purpose on occasion, staying at the lodge while in Dublin. His successor, Enda Kenny, has also stayed on occasion at the Steward's Lodge.

Today Farmleigh is operated by the OPW and the estate and gardens are largely open to the public, with the house closed except for organised tours. Seasonal events, such as craft and food markets, are held on the grounds. The estate has also been used as the venue for the RTÉ proms, a public concert series that took place each summer in a large marquee erected on the grounds.

References

External links

Historic house museums in the Republic of Ireland
Tourist attractions in Fingal
Buildings and structures in Fingal
State guesthouses